As of December 2019, the International Union for Conservation of Nature (IUCN) listed 224 critically endangered avian species, including 19 which are tagged as possibly extinct or possibly extinct in the wild. 2% of all evaluated avian species are listed as critically endangered. 
No subpopulations of birds have been evaluated by the IUCN.

Additionally 55 avian species (0.48% of those evaluated) are listed as data deficient, meaning there is insufficient information for a full assessment of conservation status. As these species typically have small distributions and/or populations, they are intrinsically likely to be threatened, according to the IUCN. While the category of data deficient indicates that no assessment of extinction risk has been made for the taxa, the IUCN notes that it may be appropriate to give them "the same degree of attention as threatened taxa, at least until their status can be assessed".

This is a complete list of critically endangered avian species evaluated by the IUCN. Species considered possibly extinct by the IUCN are marked as such. Where possible common names for taxa are given while links point to the scientific name used by the IUCN.

Procellariiformes

Gruiformes

Parrots
There are 18 parrot species assessed as critically endangered.

New Zealand parrots
Kakapo

Cockatoos
Red-vented cockatoo
Yellow-crested cockatoo
Baudin's black cockatoo

Psittacids

Pigeons and doves

Pelecaniformes

Galliformes

Bucerotiformes

Accipitriformes

Anseriformes

Owls

Charadriiformes

Coraciiformes

Passerines

Antbirds

Ovenbirds

Monarchs

Corvids

Reed-warblers

White-eyes

Laughingthrushes and allies

Thrushes

Starlings

True finches

True tanagers

Other passeriformes

Caprimulgiformes

Apodiformes

Piciformes

Other bird species

See also 
 Lists of IUCN Red List critically endangered species
 List of least concern birds
 List of near threatened birds
 List of vulnerable birds
 List of endangered birds
 List of extinct bird species since 1500
 List of data deficient birds
 List of possibly extinct birds

References 

Birds
Critically endangered birds
Critically endangered birds
Bird conservation